Sylvio Vidal Leite Ribeiro (born 1 October 1896, date of death unknown), known simply as Vidal, was a Brazilian footballer. He played in four matches for the Brazil national football team in 1917. He was also part of Brazil's squad for the 1917 South American Championship.

References

External links
 

1896 births
Year of death missing
Brazilian footballers
Brazil international footballers
Place of birth missing
Association footballers not categorized by position